Illovo may refer to:

 Illovo Sugar, a sugar producer based in Umhlanga, KwaZulu-Natal, South Africa
 Illovo, KwaZulu-Natal
 Illovo, Gauteng, a suburb of Johannesburg, South Africa